Lake Michigan Shore AVA is an American Viticultural Area located in southwest Michigan.  Located in the state's traditional "fruit belt region", Lake Michigan Shore is the oldest modern commercial grape region of the state and home to a majority of Michigan vineyards and half of the state wine grape production. Vineyards in the region date back to 1867.

Climate and geography
The "lake effect" off of Lake Michigan tempers the northern climate. Lake Michigan Shore AVA has a warmer growing season, as much as two weeks longer than the Leelanau Peninsula AVA and Old Mission Peninsula AVA, both of which are in Northern Michigan. The hardiness zone is 6a except near enough to Lake Michigan in Berrien County where it is 6b.

References

External links
 Michigan Wines

Geography of Allegan County, Michigan
American Viticultural Areas
Geography of Berrien County, Michigan
Michigan wine
Geography of Cass County, Michigan
Geography of Van Buren County, Michigan
1983 establishments in Michigan